A water well pump is a pump that is used in extracting water from a water well.

They include different kinds of pumps, most of them submersible pumps:

Hand pump, manually operated
Injector, a jet-driven pump
Mechanical or rotary lobe pump requiring mechanical parts to pump water
Solar-powered water pump
Pump driven by air as used by the Amish
Pump driven by air as used in the Australian outback
Manual pumpless or hand pump wells requiring a human operator

The pump replaces the use of a bucket and pulley system to extract water.

External links
Water well pump article
 
Pumps
Water wells